Walter John Montagu Douglas Scott, 8th Duke of Buccleuch and 10th Duke of Queensberry,  (30 December 1894 – 4 October 1973) was a British peer and Conservative politician.

Early life and education
Walter John Montagu Douglas Scott was born on 30 December 1894 the son of John Montagu Douglas Scott, 7th Duke of Buccleuch and Lady Margaret Alice "Molly" Bridgeman, the daughter of George Bridgeman, 4th Earl of Bradford and Lady Ida Annabella Frances Lumley. His sister, Alice, married Prince Henry, Duke of Gloucester (one of the paternal uncles of Queen Elizabeth II) in 1935, becoming a member of the British Royal Family.

Montagu Douglas Scott was educated at Eton College and Christ Church, Oxford, and had a military career commanding the 4th King's Own Scottish Borderers. He was also Captain-General of the Royal Company of Archers.

Political activity
As Earl of Dalkeith, Scott was Scottish Unionist Party Member of Parliament (MP) for Roxburghshire and Selkirkshire from 1923 until 1935, when he succeeded as Duke of Buccleuch and Duke of Queensberry. He was succeeded as MP for the constituency by his brother, Lord William Scott. According to Cowling, he met German ambassador Joachim von Ribbentrop in London. Seen as pro-German, he was compelled to 'resign' as Lord Steward by King George VI. He had attended Hitler's 50th birthday celebration in 1939 and he opposed war with Germany; once war broke out, he campaigned for a truce which allowed Hitler to keep all his conquered territory.

Scott inaugurated a racist campaign against workers in the British Honduran Forestry Unit who had come to Scotland to help in the war effort. He complained that not only were the workers lazy but was also concerned that some had married local women. Harold Macmillan, Under-Secretary of State for the Colonies replied to his complaints suggesting that the problem was more the extreme cold the Hondurans encountered – quite different from their tropical homeland.

Personal life

He married Vreda Esther Mary Lascelles, granddaughter of William Beauclerk, 10th Duke of St Albans, on 21 April 1921. They had three children, sixteen grandchildren, forty-four great-grandchildren and two great-great-grandchildren:

Lady Elizabeth Diana Montagu Douglas Scott (20 January 1922 – 19 September 2012) she married Hugh Percy, 10th Duke of Northumberland on 12 June 1946. They have seven children and seventeen grandchildren.
Walter Francis John Montagu Douglas Scott, 9th Duke of Buccleuch (28 September 1923 – 4 September 2007) he married Jane McNeill on 10 January 1953. They have four children, ten grandchildren and two great-grandchildren.
Lady Caroline Margaret Montagu Douglas Scott (7 November 1927 – 17 October 2004) she married Sir Ian Gilmour, 3rd Baronet on 10 July 1951. They have five children- including Sir David Robert Gilmour, 4th Bt- and seventeen grandchildren.

He died on 4 October 1973 and was buried among the ruins of Melrose Abbey.

Ancestry

Sources
Maurice Cowling, The Impact of Hitler - British Politics & Policy 1933–1940, Cambridge University Press, 1975, p. 403,

References

External links 
 

1894 births
1973 deaths
People educated at Eton College
Alumni of Christ Church, Oxford
King's Own Scottish Borderers officers
110
208
Knights Grand Cross of the Royal Victorian Order
Knights of the Thistle
Lord-Lieutenants of Roxburghshire
Members of the Privy Council of the United Kingdom
Dalkeith, Walter Montagu-Douglas-Scott, Earl of
Dalkeith, Walter Montagu-Douglas-Scott, Earl of
Dalkeith, Walter Montagu-Douglas-Scott, Earl of
Dalkeith, Walter Montagu-Douglas-Scott, Earl of
Dalkeith, Walter Montagu-Douglas-Scott, Earl of
Dalkeith, Walter Montagu-Douglas-Scott, Earl of
Buccleuch, D8
W
Members of the Royal Company of Archers
Scottish landowners
Burials at Melrose Abbey
20th-century Scottish businesspeople